Gene Towne (March 27, 1904 – March 17, 1979) was an American screenwriter. He wrote for 47 films between 1921 and 1958. He was born in New York, New York, and died in Woodland Hills, California from a heart attack.

Partial filmography

 The Life of Riley (1927)
 Ladies' Night in a Turkish Bath (1928)
 The Butter and Egg Man (1928)
 Lady Be Good (1928)
 Outcast (1928)
 The Czar of Broadway (1930)
 Wrestling Swordfish (1931)
 Business and Pleasure (1932)
 Broadway Through a Keyhole (1933)
 Shanghai (1935)
 Mary Burns, Fugitive (1935)
 She Couldn't Take It (1935)
 The Girl Friend (1935)
 You Only Live Once (1937)
 Ali Baba Goes to Town (1937)
 Eternally Yours (1939)

References

External links
 
 

1904 births
1979 deaths
American male screenwriters
20th-century American male writers
Screenwriters from New York (state)
Writers from New York City
20th-century American screenwriters